Joseph William Westphal (born January 26, 1948) is an American politician and diplomat who was most recently the United States Ambassador to Saudi Arabia. He served as the 30th United States Under Secretary of the Army from 2009 to 2014.

Early life and education
Westphal was born in Santiago, Chile. He earned a Bachelor of Arts degree from Adelphi University in New York in 1970, a Master of Arts degree from Oklahoma State University in 1973 and a Ph.D. in political science from the University of Missouri in 1980.

Career
Westphal served as the head of the department of political science at Oklahoma State University between 1975 and 1987 and as an adjunct professor at Georgetown University while working at the law firm of Patton Boggs. He served as Assistant Secretary of the Army for Civil Works from 1998 to 2001 and the Acting Secretary of the Army in 2001. He also served as chancellor of the University of Maine System from 2002 to 2006 and was a professor of political science at the University of Maine from 2002 to 2009. He later served as the provost, at The New School in New York City.

Westphal was a member of President Obama's Transition Team for Defense and was appointed as the United States Under Secretary of the Army in September 2009. He was confirmed by the U.S. Senate as ambassador to Saudi Arabia on March 26, 2014, and sworn in the same day.
Westphal is a senior global fellow  and the Chung Sun Term Professor at the Joseph H. Lauder Institute of Management and International Studies at the Wharton School, The University of Pennsylvania. Westphal is also a senior fellow at the Wharton Leadership Program at UPenn and a fellow of the National Academy of Public Administration.

References

External links

|-

|-

|-

1948 births
Living people
People from Santiago
Adelphi University alumni
Oklahoma State University alumni
University of Missouri alumni
Ambassadors of the United States to Saudi Arabia
Clinton administration personnel
Oklahoma State University faculty
Obama administration personnel
The New School faculty
United States Department of Defense officials
United States Under Secretaries of the Army
University of Maine faculty